Mohamed Shahrun Nabil Abdullah (born 5 January 1986) is a field hockey player from Kuala Terengganu, Terengganu, Malaysia.

Shahrun has more than 190 caps for Malaysia. He was part of Malaysia junior team in the 2005 Junior World Cup. He currently the skipper of Malaysia hockey team. He competed at the 2006, 2010 and 2014 Asian Games.

References

1986 births
Living people
Malaysian people of Malay descent
People from Terengganu
Malaysian male field hockey players
Asian Games medalists in field hockey
Field hockey players at the 2006 Asian Games
Field hockey players at the 2010 Asian Games
Field hockey players at the 2014 Asian Games
Asian Games silver medalists for Malaysia
Medalists at the 2010 Asian Games
Southeast Asian Games gold medalists for Malaysia
Southeast Asian Games medalists in field hockey
Competitors at the 2013 Southeast Asian Games
2014 Men's Hockey World Cup players
21st-century Malaysian people